Glycoside hydrolase family 1 is a family of glycoside hydrolases.

Glycoside hydrolases  are a widespread group of enzymes that hydrolyse the glycosidic bond between two or more carbohydrates, or between a carbohydrate and a non-carbohydrate moiety. A classification system for glycoside hydrolases, based on sequence similarity, has led to the definition of >100 different families. This classification is available on the CAZy web site, and also discussed at CAZypedia, an online encyclopedia of carbohydrate active enzymes.

Glycoside hydrolase family 1 CAZY GH_1 comprises enzymes with a number of known activities; beta-glucosidase; beta-galactosidase; 6-phospho-beta-galactosidase; 6-phospho-beta-glucosidase; lactase-phlorizin hydrolase, lactase; beta-mannosidase; myrosinase.

Subfamilies
6-phospho-beta-galactosidase

Human proteins containing this domain 
GBA3;      KL;        KLB;       LCT;       LCTL;

External links 
 GH1 in CAZypedia

References 

Peripheral membrane proteins
EC 3.2.1
GH family
Protein families